Italian tuneup is a slang automotive term for attempting to restore engine performance by driving a car at high engine speed (RPM) and load.

The term originated from Italian mechanics in the 1950s using this practice to burn off carbon deposits from the spark plugs of sports cars. However, modern fuel injection and ignition systems have rendered Italian tuneups obsolete for that particular purpose.

The practice is sometimes used prior to emissions testing, particularly for diesel engines.

References

Automotive terminology